The Venus figurines of Gagarino are eight Palaeolithic Venus figurines made from ivory. The statuettes belong to the Gravettian industry and are about 21,000–20,000 years old. They were discovered near to the village of Gagarino in Lipetsk Oblast, Russia, and are now held in the Hermitage Museum in Saint Petersburg.

The Figurine No. 1 (by Abramova 1962) is sculpted similar to the Venus of Willendorf: The depicted female body is naked and obese, which is not necessarily interpreted as pregnant. The small arms are at the side with no hands. The face is not depicted, but a headgear or a hairstyle is indicated. The breasts are heavy. The mons veneris is indicated.

See also 
 Paleolithic Art
 Venus figurines of Mal'ta

References

Further reading 
 Abramova, Z. (1962). Paleolitičeskoe iskusstvo na territorii SSSR. Moskva: Akad. Nauk SSSR, Inst. Archeologii.
 Abramova, Z. (1995). L'Art paléolithique d'Europe orientale et de Sibérie. Grenoble: Jérôme Millon.
 Cohen, C. (2003). La femme des origines. Images de la femme dans la préhistoire occidentale. Paris: Belin-Herscher.
 Delporte, H. (1979). L’image de la femme dans l’art préhistorique. Paris: Ed. Picard.

External links 

 Gagarino Venus Figures – Don's Maps

Gagarino
Prehistoric sites in Russia
Archaeology of Siberia
Ivory works of art
Archaeological collections of the Hermitage Museum
Lipetsk Oblast
Archaeological discoveries in Russia
Gravettian
Culture of Lipetsk Oblast

—